Gabriella “Gabi” Butler (born January 16, 1998) is an American cheerleader, YouTuber, television personality, and professional wrestler that is currently signed to WWE. She received national recognition after appearing in the Netflix docuseries Cheer and had been on many teams before her appearance in the Netflix show, such as the California All Stars Smoed, Top Gun TGLC, Cheer Athletics Wildcats, and Gymtyme Blink. She is most recently a member of the Weber State University and the Navarro College cheer teams.  career

Gabi Butler has been doing competitive cheerleading since she was eight years old and is known for her flexibility and her great talent in flying. She appeared regularly on AwesomenessTV's YouTube series Cheerleaders for a couple of seasons when she was on the California All Stars team Smoed (a portmanteau of "small" and "coed") between 2012 and 2014 and occasionally appeared on a few episodes of later seasons. She has won the cheerleading world championships twice, in both 2013 and 2014 with Smoed. In January 2020, she appeared on The Ellen DeGeneres Show, along with other members of the Navarro College cheer team who she went to Daytona with. She also has a YouTube channel, which gives viewers a behind the scenes look into her cheer life. As of 2021, she attends Weber State University in Ogden, Utah.

Professional wrestling career

WWE (2022–present) 
In November 2022 it was reported that Butler had signed a contract with WWE and would begin training at the WWE Performance Center she also did a handstand on a security guard.

References 

1998 births
People from Boca Raton, Florida
Navarro College cheer alumni
Living people
Television personalities from Florida
American female professional wrestlers